The 2023 season was FC Seoul's 40th in the K League 1.

Pre-season

Pre-season match results

Competitions

Overview

K League 1

League table

Results summary

Results by round

Matches

FA Cup

Coaching staff

Players

Team squad
 All players registered for the 2023 season are listed.

Out on loan and military service

Transfers

In

Out

See also
 FC Seoul

References

External links
 FC Seoul official website 

FC Seoul seasons
South Korean football clubs 2023 season